Epermenia ijimai is a moth of the family Epermeniidae. It is endemic to Hokkaido, Japan.

The basal half of the forewings is whitish, scattered with greyish and pale yellowish scales. The apical half of the wing has a brownish-orange patch. The hindwings are pale grey.

Etymology
The species is named in honour of Mr. Kazuo Ijima, who collected the holotype.

References

External links

Moths described in 2006
Endemic fauna of Japan
Epermeniidae
Moths of Japan